Admiral Sir Montague Edward Browning,  (18 January 1863 – 4 November 1947) was a senior Royal Navy officer who served as Second Sea Lord and Chief of Naval Personnel.

Military career
Browning joined the Royal Navy in 1876. He served in the Anglo-Egyptian War and then became Secretary to the Parliamentary Committee on Water Tube Boilers in 1900.

He was promoted to captain on 1 January 1902, and in June that year was appointed flag captain in command of the cruiser HMS Ariadne. She was commissioned on 5 June 1902 as flagship of Vice-Admiral Sir Archibald Douglas, the new Commander-in-Chief of the North America and West Indies Station, where she arrived to take up the position on 15 July. Browning became Chief of Staff for the Channel Fleet in 1908 and Inspector of Target Practice in 1911.

He served in the World War I as Commander of the 3rd Cruiser Squadron of the Grand Fleet and then, from 1916, as Commander-in-Chief North America and West Indies. He commanded 4th Battle Squadron of the Grand Fleet from 1918.

After the War he became President of the Allied Naval Armistice Commission and had the task of dismantling the German Fleet.

He then became Second Sea Lord and Chief of Naval Personnel in 1919. In this capacity he also sought to dismantle the Royal Canadian Navy but this time faced determined and successful opposition from Rear Admiral Walter Hose. His last appointment was as Commander-in-Chief, Plymouth from 1920. He also became First and Principal Naval Aide-de-Camp to the King in 1925 and retired from the navy on 4 October 1926.

He was also Rear Admiral of the United Kingdom from 1929 to 1939 and then Vice Admiral of the United Kingdom from 1939 to 1945.

He lived at Crawley near Winchester. His brother was Frederick Browning, a cricketer and British Army officer.

References

External links
The Dreadnought Project – Montague Browning

|-

|-

|-

|-

|-

1863 births
1947 deaths
Royal Navy admirals of World War I
Knights Grand Cross of the Order of the Bath
Knights Grand Cross of the Order of St Michael and St George
Knights Grand Cross of the Royal Victorian Order
Commandeurs of the Légion d'honneur
Recipients of the Order of the Sacred Treasure, 1st class
Recipients of the Navy Distinguished Service Medal
Royal Navy personnel of the Anglo-Egyptian War
Lords of the Admiralty
Foreign recipients of the Distinguished Service Medal (United States)
Montague